The given name Wynne may refer to:

Wynne Arboleda (born 1976), Filipino basketball player
Wynne Edwin Baxter (1844–1920), English lawyer, translator, antiquarian and botanist
Wynne Bradburn (1938–2008), New Zealand cricketer
Wynne Chin (born c. 1960), American professor of management information systems
Wynne F. Clouse (1883–1944), U.S. Representative from Tennessee
Wynne Ellis (1790–1875), wealthy British haberdasher, politician and art collector
Wynne Evans (born 1972), Welsh singer and actor
Wynne Gibson (short for "Winifred"; 1898–1987), American actress
Wynne Godley (1926–2010), British economist and critic of the British government
Wynne Greenwood (born 1977), American queer feminist performance artist
Wynne Grey Rogers (1874–1946), Justice of the Louisiana Supreme Court
Wynne Hooper (born 1952), Welsh former professional footballer
Wynne Neilly (born 1989/90), Canadian photographer
Wynne Paris (born 1964), American new-age and world beat musician
Wynne Prakusya (born 1981), Indonesian tennis player
Wynne Pyle (1881–1971), American concert pianist
Wynne Samuel (1911–1989), Welsh politician

See also
Wynne (surname) 

 Welsh unisex given names